Comat is an Indian social enterprise specializing in the delivery of information based services to rural citizens in India. It was founded in 1996 and currently has over 800 rural centers from which it serves over 75,000 citizens each day. In June 2011, Comat was acquired by Glodyn Technoserve, an IT services company headquartered in Mumbai, India. The company's prior investors included Omidyar Network, Avigo Capital and Elevar Equity.

Services
Comat has been involved in several projects that have eased people's access to essential information based services, especially in the State of Karnataka. The Company provides Government, Education and Financial Services to rural citizens through 800 telecentres set up as part of Project Nemmadi, an expansion of the Rural Digital Services pilot. Comat has also been involved in the digitization of over 20 million land records (Bhoomi (software)), that has benefited over 6.7 million farmers in the State.

In partnership with the department of Food, Civil Supplies and Consumer Affairs, Comat has created a biometric database of over 45 million citizens living in Karnataka. This is the largest electronic citizen database in India and can act as the stepping stone for the Unique Identification Number. Comat has begun the Proof of Concept for the Unique Identification Number in two districts of Karnataka.

References

External links
 An Internet for Rural India
 Comat has digitized ration cards in Karnataka. This is estimated to save over Rs. 450 million a month for the state.

Rural community development
Social enterprises